Rock Island is an unincorporated community in Colorado County, Texas, United States. According to the Handbook of Texas, the community had an estimated population of 160 in 2000.

Geography
Rock Island is situated along U.S. Highway 90A in Colorado County, approximately 12 miles southwest of Columbus and 15 miles west of Eagle Lake

History
The area was settled in 1896 as part of a land promotion scheme on the Texas and New Orleans Railroad. The survey and map of the community was completed on February 19, 1896. Initially known as Crasco, after nearby Crasco Creek, citizens petitioned the post office department to change the name to Rock Island in 1897. The petition was granted and Charles Petersen was appointed the first postmaster of Rock Island on August 9, 1897. Dueling realtors' intent on outselling each other recruited land-buyers from Illinois, Iowa, and Missouri, promising a "tropical paradise" near the Gulf of Mexico. By 1904, Rock Island had a population of 367. In July 1909 a hurricane made landfall near present-day Freeport. The storm passed over Rock Island with winds estimated to be around 75 mph. Several downtown structures, including a bank, were destroyed. The population of Rock Island peaked in 1925 at around 500. In the 1960s, the community suffered several fires that left large gaps in the former downtown. The number of inhabitants had fallen to 160 by the mid-1980s. It remained at that level through 2000.

Rock Island has a post office with the ZIP code 77470.

Education
Public education in the community of Rock Island is provided by the Columbus Independent School District.

References

External links

Unincorporated communities in Colorado County, Texas
Unincorporated communities in Texas